John Peisley may refer to:
 John Peisley (politician)
 John Peisley (bushranger)

See also
 John Paisley (disambiguation)